Carl Adam Wilkinson (born 16 May 1981) is a British speedway rider.

Career
Born in Boston, England, Wilkinson started his career with the Peterborough Panthers in the Conference League in 1997 a week before his sixteenth birthday. It took another two seasons before he was awarded a regular Conference League ride when he was signed by his local club, the Boston Barracudas in 2000. That same season he made his Premier League debut, riding as a guest for the Newcastle Diamonds.

Wilkinson has ridden for Great Britain at under-21 level. He won the Conference League with the Peterborough Pumas in 1997 and the Conference League KO Cup with the Boston Barracudas in 2000.

He was retained by Boston for 2001, but 2002 saw him signed up by the Newport Wasps for their Premier League team, where he recorded a 4.35 average in his first season. He improved that figure to 4.95 in 2003. He recorded a 4.82 average in 2004 but was forced out of their line-up in 2005 due to the points limit.

Wilkinson was not offered a team place with a Premier League club in 2005 so he rejoined the Barracudas in the Conference League. His form did not go unnoticed by the Berwick Bandits and in June was signed up to ride for the rest of the season. He also made his top flight debut as a guest for the Ipswich Witches in the Craven Shield.

The 2006 season saw Wilkinson return his parent club Newport and he finished second of their team averages on 6.99. He was snapped up by the Newcastle Diamonds in 2007 and finished the season with an average of 6.32. He also made nine appearances for the Wolverhampton Wolves, recording an Elite League average of just over three.

The Scunthorpe Scorpions signed Wilkinson on a full transfer from Newport for their maiden Premier League season in 2008 and he stayed until 2011. In 2009 he shared a reserve berth in the Elite League for the Ipswich Witches. From 2012 to 2015 he rode for Redcar Bears in the Premier League, moving back to Scunthorpe Scorpions in 2015. In 2016 he continues to ride for Scunthorpe and also returns to the Elite League riding at reserve for King's Lynn.

References

British speedway riders
English motorcycle racers
Newport Wasps riders
Berwick Bandits riders
Ipswich Witches riders
Newcastle Diamonds riders
Peterborough Panthers riders
Glasgow Tigers riders
Scunthorpe Scorpions riders
Redcar Bears riders
1981 births
Living people